, there were 494 electric vehicles registered in Prince Edward Island. , 8.4% of new cars sold in Prince Edward Island were electric.

Government policy
, the provincial government offers tax rebates of $5,000 for new electric vehicle purchases.

Charging stations
The first public DC charging stations in Prince Edward Island opened in late 2019.

By region

Charlottetown
, there were 19 public charging stations in Charlottetown.

Summerside
, Summerside has the largest number of charging station per capita in Canada.

References

Prince Edward Island
Transport in Prince Edward Island